Seyran is a given name. Notable people with the name include:

 Seyran Ates (born 1963), German lawyer
 Seyran Ohanyan (born 1962), Armenian general
 Seyran Osipov (1961–2008), Russian footballer
 Seyran Saroyan (1967–2022), Armenian general and politician
 Seyran Shahsuvaryan (born 1953), Armenian general

Turkish feminine given names